Nicholas Robert Rogers (born 4 October 1977, in Lymington) is a sailing competitor from Great Britain.  He won silver medals at the 2004 Athens and 2008 Beijing Olympics with Joe Glanfield in the 470 (dinghy) class. The pair began sailing together in 1997.

References

People from Lymington
Living people
English male sailors (sport)
Sailors at the 2000 Summer Olympics – 470
Sailors at the 2004 Summer Olympics – 470
Sailors at the 2008 Summer Olympics – 470
Olympic sailors of Great Britain
British male sailors (sport)
Olympic silver medallists for Great Britain
1977 births
Olympic medalists in sailing
Medalists at the 2008 Summer Olympics
Medalists at the 2004 Summer Olympics